Heterogagrella is a genus of harvestmen in the family Sclerosomatidae from Southeast Asia.

Species
 Heterogagrella biseriata S. Suzuki, 1981
 Heterogagrella indica Roewer, 1954

References

Harvestmen
Harvestman genera